Hines Holt (April 27, 1805 – November 4, 1865) was an American lawyer and politician who served as a United States representative from Georgia.

Early years and education
Hines Holt was born near Milledgeville, Georgia, to Hines Holt and Mary Dixon Seward Holt. He completed preparatory studies in Milledgeville and graduated with a Bachelor of Arts (A.B.) from the University of Georgia's Franklin College in Athens, Georgia in 1824. He studied law and was admitted to the bar and began a practice in Columbus, Georgia. In 1838, Holt married Sarah Ann Perry. The couple had six children, four girls and two boys. In January 1846 Holt became one of the first 15 lawyers admitted to practice before the Supreme Court of Georgia. In 1855, Holt purchased Wynn House, in Columbus, Georgia, which still stands today.

Political service
Holt was an electoral college member in the 1832 presidential election. A decade later, he was elected to the Georgia House of Representatives in 1841; however, he was then elected as a Whig to the 26th United States Congress to fill the vacancy caused by the resignation of his cousin Walter T. Colquitt and served from February 1, 1841, to March 4, 1841. He resumed the practice of law and served as the Treasurer of Georgia in 1859. That same year, Holt was elected to the Georgia Senate and he was re-elected the following year. He became a member of the House of Representatives of the First Confederate Congress in 1862 and resigned on March 1, 1863, after the third session.

Death and legacy
Hines Holt died while attending as a delegate the State constitutional convention at Milledgeville on November 4, 1865. He was buried in Linwood Cemetery in Columbus, Georgia.

References

External links 
 
 
  Oil painting of "Mrs. Hines Holt" (1838)
  Historic Marker, noting that Hines Holt was among the first 15 lawyers admitted to practice before the Georgia Supreme Court
 Modern Photograph of historic Wynn House - purchased by Hines Holt in 1855

1805 births
1865 deaths
Georgia (U.S. state) state senators
Georgia (U.S. state) lawyers
Members of the Georgia House of Representatives
University of Georgia alumni
Members of the Confederate House of Representatives from Georgia (U.S. state)
State treasurers of Georgia (U.S. state)
Whig Party members of the United States House of Representatives from Georgia (U.S. state)
American slave owners
19th-century American politicians
19th-century American lawyers